Legia is the Polish football club from Warsaw. Other meanings include:

 1261 Legia, a dark Themistian asteroid
 Legia Poznań, a defunct Polish football club from Poznań
 Legia Warsaw (sports club), a Polish multi-sports club from Warsaw